Sulisława (died after 25 December 1294) was a daughter of Pomeranian knight.

She was originally a nun in Słupsk, but in about 1285, she became the mistress of Mestwin II. On 26 August 1288, after his divorce from Euphrosyne of Opole, Mestwin married Sulisława.

Sources
B. Śliwiński Poczet książąt gdańskich, Gdańsk 2006, s. 53
B. Śliwiński Kronikarskie niedyskrecje, czyli życie prywatne Piastów, Gdańsk 2004, s. 76-77

13th-century births
1288 deaths
Mistresses of Polish royalty